Bersham Ironworks were large ironworks at Bersham, near Wrexham, Wales. They are most famous for being the original working site of John Wilkinson. They were also the first site in the world to use a new way of boring holes in cannon and steam engine cylinders.

History
Ironworking began at Bersham around 1640, and evidence shows that the cannon for the Royalists in the English Civil War were made there. In the 18th century, Isaac Wilkinson bought the ironworks and ran it for a considerable number of years. The main product was cannon, although the process to make them in iron was difficult, and cannonballs often became stuck in the barrel, leading to explosions.

When Isaac's son John Wilkinson took over, he employed a boring machine to accurately make a smooth bore cannon, which became so popular that cannons produced using this technique were used in the American War of Independence and the Napoleonic wars. As well as cannon, the smooth bore machine could make cylinders for Boulton & Watt steam engines, leading Wilkinson to enter into a partnership with Watt to make the cylinders. However, Watt discovered Wilkinson had been marketing his own black market steam engines on the side, and the partnership was therefore terminated.

With Europe and the world returning to peace, the market for cannon was lost. The space to expand at Bersham had run out, and Wilkinson needed to move on. He bought a house and estate at nearby Brymbo and built a blast furnace there, at what would later become Brymbo Steelworks.

John Wilkinson had fallen out with his brother William, who raised a small gang to destroy Bersham Ironworks. Upon hearing this, John Wilkinson also raised a gang and helped the destruction: he was only too happy to destroy the mill which was causing him a loss. Only three structures survived: the mill building; the building which housed the smooth bore machine; and a lime kiln.

After this, the site was leased to a family who opened a paper mill on the site. This did not last a long time, however, and the site was left derelict. The site on the southern bank of the River Clywedog had been completely destroyed, while the original works were in a state of decay. The site passed into agricultural use, and the "Mill building" became a mill, complete with a water wheel, still intact today. Most of the mill building has new red brick roof built on the old sandstone walls.

Excavation and debate
Between 1987 and 1991, extensive excavations were carried out on the site, and revealed all the foundations of the original buildings and the rear wall of the engine house. They also revealed a lime kiln, with lime on the walls. Another excavation showed it was a blast furnace, as pig iron was found around it. This opened debate to what it actually was, and the debate is taught in local schools. Another find during the excavations was a wooden railway. The world's first excavated wooden waggonway, that led from a site near Minera Limeworks to a shelf above the works, presumably for tipping of lime, needed for the ironmaking process. The piece of track, carbonised, still rests at the museum inside the mill building.

Restoration and preservation
Now that the historical importance of Bersham was recognised, Wrexham Council put the site forward for preservation as the Bersham Heritage Centre. The nearby Bersham School was reopened as an extensive museum dedicated to local history and Bersham Ironworks, and holds the remaining smooth bore cutting piece from the machine. The Mill building was restored and opened as a secondary museum, and contains artefacts such as the wooden waggonway and several pieces from the excavations, with a guided tour of them all. Most recently, the building that made the cannon's smooth bores was given a new roof and internal scaffolding to reinforce the structure. Now the site is earmarked for more funding by the Welsh Government.

External links
Wrexham Council Minisite
Wrexham Council - Bersham Heritage Centre

Ironworks and steelworks in Wales
Former buildings and structures in Wrexham County Borough
Museums in Wrexham County Borough
Industry museums in Wales